Chautauqua County/Jamestown Airport at Robert H. Jackson Field  is a county-owned, public-use airport located three nautical miles (6 km) north of the central business district of Jamestown, in Chautauqua County, New York, United States. It is mostly used for general aviation.

As per the Federal Aviation Administration, this airport had 4,415 passenger boardings (enplanements) in calendar year 2008, 3,560 in 2009, and 3,679 in 2010. The National Plan of Integrated Airport Systems for 2011–2015 categorized it as a non-primary commercial service airport.

Until 2018, the airport was subsidized by the Essential Air Service to provide passenger air service. The EAS funding was terminated in January 2018, as not enough passengers were utilizing the airport.

Facilities and aircraft 
Chautauqua County/Jamestown Airport covers an area of 788 acres (319 ha) at an elevation of 1,723 feet (525 m) above mean sea level. It has two runways with asphalt surfaces: 7/25 is 5,299 by 100 feet (1,615 x 30 m) and 13/31 is 4,500 by 100 feet (1,372 x 30 m).

For the 12-month period ending December 31, 2009, the airport had 16,394 aircraft operations, an average of 44 per day: 84% general aviation, 16% scheduled commercial, and <1% military. At that time there were 25 aircraft based at this airport: 76% single-engine, 20% multi-engine, and 4% helicopter.

Airlines and destinations 

After the suspension of the EAS funding, Southern Airways Express, the lone operator at the airport, withdrew its service, leaving the airport without any permanent airline tenants. Boutique Air has requested to restore service to the airport but is insisting on EAS funding to do so. The Federal Aviation Administration rejected any restoration of EAS funding to the airport in February 2019, reiterating its previous stance in withdrawing the funds.

Statistics

Ground transportation 
The airport is served by New York State Route 60 and the Southern Tier Expressway.

Various taxis have access to and from the airport. The Hertz Corporation has a car rental counter.

Shops and restaurants 
The airport currently has no permanent shops.  The Tarmac Cafe, which previously provided meal services, closed in 2016.

References

Other sources 

 Essential Air Service documents (Docket OST-2003-14950) from the U.S. Department of Transportation:
 Order 2006-3-17 (March 24, 2006): selecting RegionsAir to provide essential air service (EAS) with 30-passenger Saab 340 aircraft at Bradford, Pennsylvania, and Jamestown, New York, for two years. Service will be three round trips a day to Cleveland Hopkins International Airport, and the annual subsidy rate will be set at $1,649,913.
 Order 2006-9-20 (September 21, 2006): tentatively vacating Order 2006-3-17 that selected Regions Air, Inc., to provide essential air service at Bradford, Pennsylvania, and Jamestown, New York, for two years. In addition, the Department is tentatively selecting Colgan Air, Inc., d/b/a US Airways Express to provide essential air service at both communities under its Pittsburgh option, i.e., three round trips each weekday and weekend to Pittsburgh at an annual subsidy rate of $2,434,827.
 Order 2006-10-3 (October 4, 2006): finalizes Order 2006-9-20, which tentatively vacated our earlier selection of RegionsAir, Inc. to provide EAS at Bradford and Jamestown, and instead selects Colgan Air, Inc. d/b/a US Airways Express to provide EAS at both communities from October 1, 2006, through September 30, 2008, at an annual subsidy rate of $2,434,827. The subsidy rate is based on service to Pittsburgh, although Colgan has stated it is evaluating serving Washington Dulles International Airport instead of Pittsburgh, the service originally supported by both communities, at the same subsidy rate.
 Order 2008-6-37 (June 30, 2008): selecting Gulfstream International Airlines, Inc. to provide subsidized essential air service (EAS) at Bradford, Pennsylvania, and Jamestown, New York, at a total annual subsidy of $2,701,865, for the two-year period from October 1, 2008, through September 30, 2010. However, if Gulfstream does not inaugurate full EAS by October 1, 2008, the selection defaults to Colgan Air, Inc. d/b/a United Express for the same two-period, for a total annual subsidy of $3,826,587.
 Order 2010-9-12 (September 9, 2010): re-selecting Gulfstream International Airlines to provide essential air service (EAS) at Bradford, DuBois, and Oil City/Franklin, Pennsylvania, and Jamestown, New York, for a combined annual subsidy of $5,870,657 ($1,639,254 for Jamestown), from October 1, 2010, through September 30, 2012.
 Order 2012-9-23 (September 27, 2012): selecting Silver Airways to provide Essential Air Service (EAS) at Bradford, DuBois, Franklin/Oil City, Pennsylvania, Jamestown, New York, and Parkersburg, West Virginia/Marietta, Ohio, for a combined annual subsidy of $10,348,117 ($1,940,272 for Bradford; $2,587,029 for DuBois, $1,293,515 for Franklin, $1,940,272 for Jamestown, and $2,587,029 for Parkersburg), from October 1, 2012, through September 30, 2014.
 Notice of Intent (February 14, 2014): of Silver Airways Corp. to discontinue scheduled air service between Cleveland, Ohio (CLE) and: Jamestown, New York (JHW), Bradford, Pennsylvania (BFD), DuBois, Pennsylvania (DUJ), Franklin/Oil City, Pennsylvania (FKL), and Parkersburg, West Virginia/Marietta, Ohio (PKB).

External links 
  at New York State DOT Airport Directory
 Aerial image as of April 1994 from USGS The National Map
 

Airports in New York (state)
Former Essential Air Service airports
Jamestown Airport